Give the Lady What She Wants is a 1958 studio album by Lena Horne, with Lennie Hayton and His Orchestra. The third studio album Lena Horne released on the RCA Victor label, this album peaked at #20 in the Billboard 200 album charts. The album has been re-issued on CD, firstly by BMG/RCA, Japan in 2004 and in 2010 by Avid Easy Records, together with two other studio albums, Stormy Weather and A Friend of Yours. This 2CD release also includes the live RCA Victor recordings At the Waldorf Astoria and the four tracks previously only available on the EP At the Cocoanut Grove.

Track listing
 "Diamonds Are a Girl's Best Friend" (Leo Robin, Jule Styne) – 2:15
 "People Will Say We're in Love" (Oscar Hammerstein II, Richard Rodgers) – 3:23
 "Just in Time" (Betty Comden, Adolph Green, Styne) – 2:56
 "Honey in the Honeycomb" (Vernon Duke, John La Touche) – 2:29
 "You Better Know It" (Duke Ellington) – 2:55
 "Get Out of Town" (Cole Porter) – 2:24
 "Baubles, Bangles and Beads" (Robert C. Wright, George Forrest, Alexander Borodin) – 2:44
 "Bewitched, Bothered and Bewildered" (Lorenz Hart, Richard Rodgers) – 3:14
 "At Long Last Love (song)" (Porter) – 2:40
 "Speak Low" (Ogden Nash, Kurt Weill) – 3:29
 "Love" (Ralph Blane, Hugh Martin) – 3:23
 "Let's Put Out the Lights (and Go to Sleep)" (Herman Hupfeld) – 2:10

Personnel

Performance
Lena Horne – vocals
Lennie Hayton – arranger
Ralph Burns - arranger

References

Lena Horne albums
RCA Records albums
1958 albums
Albums arranged by Ralph Burns
Albums arranged by Lennie Hayton